Stow was a hundred of Suffolk, consisting of .

Stow Hundred a fertile and picturesque district in central Suffolk around seven miles (11 km) in length and breadth. It is bounded by Cosford, Bosmere and Claydon, Thedwestry, Blackbourn and Hartismere Hundreds. It is in the Deanery to which it gives name and was in the Archdeaconry of Sudbury until 1837 when it was added to the Archdeaconry of Suffolk, and is thus still in the Diocese of Norwich. It is watered by the River Gipping.

The word "stow" means place, as in "stow away", and the name of the hundred was probably derived from an old name for Stowmarket, the hundred's largest town.

Parishes

Stow Hundred consisted of the following 14 parishes:

References

Hundreds of Suffolk